Jonathan Russell Bullock (September 6, 1815 – May 7, 1899) was a justice of the Supreme Court of Rhode Island and a United States district judge of the United States District Court for the District of Rhode Island.

Education and career

Born in Bristol, Rhode Island, Bullock graduated from Brown University in 1834 and read law to enter the bar in 1836. He was in private practice in Alton, Illinois from 1836 to 1843, and served on the Alton Common Council. He was in private practice in Bristol from 1843 to 1849, serving as a member of the Rhode Island House of Representatives from 1844 to 1846. He was the Attorney General of Rhode Island in 1849. He was collector of customs in Bristol and Warren, Rhode Island from 1849 to 1853, then served in the Rhode Island Senate in 1859 before becoming Lieutenant Governor of Rhode Island in 1860 under Governor William Sprague IV. After briefly serving as a special commissioner to adjust accounts between Rhode Island and the Government of the United States, he served as a justice of the Rhode Island Supreme Court from September 7, 1862 until his resignation on March 1, 1864.

Federal judicial service

On February 9, 1865, Bullock was nominated by President Abraham Lincoln to a seat on the United States District Court for the District of Rhode Island vacated by Judge John Pitman. Bullock was confirmed by the United States Senate on February 11, 1865, and received his commission the same day. Bullock served in that capacity until his resignation on September 15, 1869.

Death

Bullock died on May 7, 1899, in Bristol.

References

Sources
 

1815 births
1899 deaths
People from Alton, Illinois
People from Bristol, Rhode Island
Illinois lawyers
Rhode Island lawyers
Illinois city council members
Justices of the Rhode Island Supreme Court
Rhode Island state senators
Lieutenant Governors of Rhode Island
Members of the Rhode Island House of Representatives
Rhode Island Attorneys General
Judges of the United States District Court for the District of Rhode Island
United States federal judges appointed by Abraham Lincoln
19th-century American judges
United States federal judges admitted to the practice of law by reading law
19th-century American politicians